Skolkovo is a rural locality (a village) in Odintsovsky District of Moscow Oblast, Russia, located  west of MKAD near the Setun River.  Population: 325 (2005 est.).

The village has been known since the 16th century. In 1862, the population of the village lived in 23 homesteads comprising 226 people (104 male and 112 female).

In March 2010, Russian President Dmitry Medvedev announced plans to create Skolkovo Innovation Center—a modern technology complex to encourage scientific research and development. The construction of the center is expected to start in the vicinity of Skolkovo in 2011. Currently, another major project is realized near Skolkovo - the construction of the campus of Skolkovo Moscow School of Management.

See also
  National Technological Initiative

References

External links
Odintsovo.info.  Сколково — непростая история небольшого села

 
Odintsovsky District
Rural localities in Moscow Oblast